

List of Ambassadors

Ran Yaakoby 2020 - present
Itzhak Gerberg 2016 - 2020
Yosef Livne 2013 - 2016
Shemi Tzur 2010 - 2013
Yuval Rotem 2007-2013
Naftali Tamir 2005-2007
Ruth Kahanoff 2001 - 2002
Lydia Chokron 1998 - 2001
Nissan Krupsky 1993 - 1998
Shmuel Ovnat 1989 - 1993
Efraim Eldar 1986 - 1989
Zvi Zimmerman 1983-1986
Yaakov Moris 1977 - 1982
Haim Raphael 1974 - 1977
Moshe Erell (Non-Resident, Canberra) 1970 - 1974
Simcha Pratt (Non-Resident, Canberra) 1967 - 1970
Moshe Yuval (Non-Resident, Canberra) 1958 - 1963
Mordekhai Nurock (Non-Resident, Canberra) 1953 - 1958
Minister Joseph Ivor Linton 1950 - 1952

References 

New Zealand
Israel